The 1933 FA Charity Shield was the 20th FA Charity Shield, an annual football match.  It was played between Everton (1932–33 FA Cup winners) and Arsenal (1932–33 Football League champions) at Goodison Park in Liverpool on 18 October 1933.  Arsenal won the match 0–3.

Match details

|

References

FA Community Shield
Charity Shield
FA Charity Shield
Charity Shield 1933
Charity Shield 1933
Charity Shield 1933